The Foyle Valley Railway is a  narrow gauge heritage railway in Derry, Northern Ireland.

Foyle Valley Railway Museum was initially opened in 1990 on the site of Foyle Road station of the GNR (Ireland). In August 2016, Destined Ltd, a charity for adults with learning disabilities, secured a lease on the premises and reopened the museum which had been closed to the public since 2002. A number of Destined members were trained as Museum by a staff member of Derry & Strabane District Council's Museum Service.

The exhibition consists of a recreated station platform and visitors can find out about the various railway companies which once operated out of the city.

The steam locomotive exhibited in front of the museum is a  narrow gauge locomotive built for the County Donegal Railways Joint Committee in 1907 by Nasmyth, Wilson &Co., originally numbered No.16 and named "Donegal". She was superheated in 1926 and then renamed and renumbered as No.4 "Meenglas" in 1937. The locomotive was withdrawn from service on 31 December 1959, when the CDJRC ceased to exist as a railway company.

Initially, a former County Donegal diesel railcar ran along a  stretch of track along the riverbank. in 2002, the North West of Ireland Railway Society relocated the railcar to the Fintown narrow gauge railway in County Donegal.

Rolling stock

Original use 
The current railway structures formed the Londonderry Foyle Road railway station, terminus of the Great Northern Railway (Ireland) route into the city on the west bank of the River Foyle from Strabane and Omagh.

See also 
List of heritage railways in Northern Ireland

References 

Heritage railways in Northern Ireland
3 ft gauge railways in Northern Ireland
Tourist attractions in Derry (city)